The 2022 Junior and Cadet World Fencing Championships took place from 2 to 10 April 2022 in Dubai, UAE. The opening ceremony was held on 3 April 2022.

Nations 
The following nations sent fencers to these Championships:

 
 
 
 
 
 
 
 
 
 
 
 
 
 
 
 
 
 
 
 
 
 
 
 
 
 
 
 
 
 
 
 
 
 
 
 
 
 
 
 
 
 
 
 
 
 
 
 
 
 
 
 
 
 
 
 
 
 
 
 
 
 
 
 
 
 
 
 
 
 
 
 
 
 
 
 
 
 
 
 
 
 
 
 
 
 
 
 
 
 
 
 
 
 
 
 
 
 
 

Note: Due to the ongoing Russian invasion of Ukraine, fencers from Russia and Belarus were banned from competing.

Medals summary

Junior

Men

Women

Cadet

Men

Women

Medal table

See also
 2022 European Cadets and Juniors Fencing Championships
 2022 Asian Cadets and Juniors Fencing Championships

References

External links 
 Official website
 FencingTime Live results

Junior World Fencing Championships
Junior
Fencing
International sports competitions hosted by the United Arab Emirates
Sports competitions in Dubai
Fencing
Fencing